The 1951 Toronto Argonauts finished in third place in the Interprovincial Rugby Football Union with a 7–5 record and appeared in the IRFU Semi-Final.

Preseason
The Argos played a preseason game in Buffalo, New York.

Regular season

Standings

Schedule

Postseason

References

Toronto Argonauts seasons
1951 Canadian football season by team